The Austrian Society for Geomechanics (ÖGG or OeGG) is the professional association for scientific geomechanics in underground engineering in Austria.

History 
Leopold Müller, geologist and one of the founders of the New Austrian Tunneling Method (NAT/NÖT), worked in Salzburg in the 1950s after his involvement with the Kaprun power plant. Here, in 1951, he initiated a colloquium on the boundary issues of rock engineering and rock mechanical technologies. This made Salzburg, alongside Leoben, an Austrian center for mining (Salzburg Circle of Josef Stini's students; Austrian School of Rock Mechanics).

In 1962, the International Society for Rock Mechanics (ISRM; International Versuchsanstalt für Fels) was established in Salzburg, and has been based at the Laboratório Nacional de Engenharia Civil (LNEC) in Lisbon since 1966. As a result, in 1968 the Austrian Society for Geomechanics was founded as the national society of the ISRM. It is organized as an association.

In 1998, the society was restructured and four specialized sections were formed. In 2008, the association statutes were modernized.

Organization 
The society is based in Salzburg, in Innsbrucker Bundesstraße (Maxglan). The chairman is Wulf Schubert, institute director for rock mechanics and tunneling at the University of Graz (as of 2016). In 2015, the ÖGG had approximately 600 regular members and over 40 supporting members. It is divided into specialized sections for interdisciplinary collaboration, and working groups as needed.

The ÖGG is the Austrian representative of the International Society for Rock Mechanics (ISRM) and its territorial body, the National Adhering Body. It is also a member of the Austrian National Committee ITA Austria of the International Tunneling Association (ITA).

Agendas 
The association is a non-profit organization with a purely scientific focus.
Its tasks, according to the statutes, are as follows:
 The scientific exploration of the properties of soil and rock and their behavior under all types of influences;
 The cultivation of relationships with scientific institutions with similar objectives in Austria and abroad, as well as with neighboring fields of expertise;
 The exchange of experiences and ideas in the field of planning, execution, and maintenance of structures in soil and rock among representatives of the construction industry, scientific institutions, engineering offices, clients, and authorities;
 The improvement of construction methods, dimensioning, and design of structures in soil and rock with the aim of a safe, economical, and environmentally friendly construction;
 The development and publication of manuals, guidelines, and other publications related to the planning, execution, and maintenance of structures in soil and rock.

The four professional sections deal with the following topics:
 Rock mechanics and rock engineering
 Soil mechanics and foundation engineering
 Cavern engineering
 Engineering geology
In addition to its own symposium Geomechanik Kolloquium, the society also sponsors numerous other international events in the field and industry.

Geomechanics Colloquium 
This scientific conference has been held since 1951. It is usually held annually at the Kongresshaus Salzburg, and is the most important mining-related major event in Austria, along with the biennial Austrian Tunnelling Conference in Vienna (co-organized by the ITA Austria). For example, in 2014 it was combined with the Tunnelling Conference, and in 2015 with the EUROCK of the ISRM. The conference reports appear in the journal Geomechanics and Tunnelling, which is published by the ÖGG.

Geomechanics and Tunnelling Technical Journal 

Since 1983, ÖGG has published a technical journal on engineering geology, geomechanics, and tunneling, called FELSBAU – Rock and Soil Engineering. Since 2008, the journal has been renamed Geomechanik und Tunnelbau and is also available in English as Geomechanics and Tunnelling.

The journal is published six times a year in special issues focusing on specific topics, especially in tunneling. The proceedings of the Geomechanik Kolloquium and the Österreichischer Tunneltag are also regularly published in this series.

It is published by Ernst & Sohn, a publishing house for architecture and technical sciences, in Berlin. The publisher is part of the John Wiley Group (Wiley-Blackwell), and since 2008, the journal has also been available on the Wiley Online Library web portal.

The editor-in-chief is Helmut Richter from Ernst & Sohn publishing house. Currently, Bernd Moritz (ÖBB-Infrastructure, Graz) and Robert Galler (Montanuniversität Leoben) are responsible as advisory board chairpersons, which is composed of ÖGG members and international members.

Geomechanics and Tunnelling is indexed in Scopus by Elsevier, and in 2020, it achieved a CiteScore of 1.0.

External links 
Website (in German/English)

References 

Organisations based in Salzburg
Construction organizations
1968 establishments in Austria
Tunnel construction